Illinois Route 148 is a north–south state road in southern Illinois. It runs from Illinois Route 37 at Pulleys Mill (near the intersection of Interstate 24 and Interstate 57) north to the western terminus of Illinois Route 142 and Illinois 37 south of downtown Mount Vernon.

Route description 
Illinois 148 is a western parallel of Illinois 37 from Pulleys Mill to Mount Vernon. It passes through the city of Herrin, a medium-sized city in Williamson County. It is a two-laned surface road for its entire length.

History 
SBI Route 148 ran from Marion to Mount Vernon. In 1964 it was extended south to Pulleys Mill. There have been no changes to Illinois 148 since.

Major Intersections

References

External links

148
Transportation in Williamson County, Illinois
Transportation in Franklin County, Illinois
Transportation in Jefferson County, Illinois